William Wilson White Sr. (February 23, 1906 – November 11, 1964) was a prominent attorney in Philadelphia, Pennsylvania and served as the first United States Assistant Attorney General for the United States Department of Justice Civil Rights Division from 1957 to 1960. He was the United States Attorney for the Eastern District of Pennsylvania from 1953 to 1957. White was also a partner in the law firm White and Williams LLP which was founded by his father, Thomas Raeburn White.

He graduated from Harvard College and University of Pennsylvania Law School.

References

1906 births
1964 deaths
20th-century American judges
Eisenhower administration personnel
United States Assistant Attorneys General for the Civil Rights Division
United States Assistant Attorneys General for the Office of Legal Counsel
United States Attorneys for the Eastern District of Pennsylvania
University of Pennsylvania Law School alumni
Harvard College alumni